is a Japanese voice actress currently employed by Aoni Production. She currently resides in Tokyo. In the past, she has been credited under the stage name .

Roles

Anime television series
 Attack on Titan - Moses's Mother (Ep. 1)
 Pokémon: Advanced Generation - Yoshie
 Yawara! A Fashionable Judo Girl - Sayaka's mother

OVA
 Crying Freeman - Tanya
 Fullmetal Alchemist: Brotherhood - Madam Hamburgang
 Initial D: Extra Stage 2 - Koichiro Iketani's mother
 Kishin Corps: Alien Defender Geo-Armor - Helen
 Tomoe ga Yuku -  Kaori Mishima

Video games
 Abalaburn - Evil Baal
 Super Schwarzschild - Narrator
 Super Schwarzschild II - Narrator
 Dragon Slayer: The Legend of Heroes - Silphie
 Policenauts - Meryl Silverburgh
 Metal Gear Solid - Meryl Silverburgh
 Metal Gear Solid 2: Sons of Liberty - Olga Gurlukovich
 Metal Gear Solid 4: Guns of the Patriots - Meryl Silverburgh

Dub roles
 Babylon 5 - Susan Ivanova
 Easy A - Rosemary Penderghast

Tokusatsu
 Mahou Sentai Magiranger - Sphinx (Voice)

References

External links
 Aoni Productions profile (Japanese)
 
 

1958 births
Living people
Japanese voice actresses
20th-century Japanese actresses
21st-century Japanese actresses
Aoni Production voice actors